Anton "Toni" Prijon is a former West German slalom canoeist who competed in the 1980s.

He won two medals in the K-1 event at the ICF Canoe Slalom World Championships with a gold in 1987 and a silver in 1983. He also won a gold (1985) and a silver (1983) in the K-1 team event at the World Championships.

References

German male canoeists
Living people
Year of birth missing (living people)
Medalists at the ICF Canoe Slalom World Championships